This is a list of prisons within Inner Mongolia region of the People's Republic of China.

Sources 

Buildings and structures in Inner Mongolia
Inner Mongolia